Surrey is the second most populous city in Metro Vancouver and the second most populous city in British Columbia.

Surrey City Centre, the central residential and commercial district of Surrey, has become home to numerous high-rise buildings since the mid-2000s. The district contains the highest concentration of high-rise condominiums in Metro Vancouver south of the Fraser River. Due to massive population growth in Surrey and south of the Fraser River, Surrey City Centre is planned to be developed to become Metro Vancouver's second downtown core, with many office buildings and transit oriented development around the Expo line of the Skytrain that passes through.

Tallest buildings
This includes spires and architectural details but does not include antenna masts.

Tallest buildings under construction
This includes spires and architectural details but does not include antenna masts.

Under Construction

See also 
List of tallest buildings in British Columbia
List of tallest buildings in Burnaby
List of tallest buildings in Coquitlam

References 

Surrey
Tallest
Tallest buildings in Surrey